Kola Darreh may refer to:
 Kola Darreh, Mazandaran
 Kola Darreh, Qazvin